Bryan Wells may refer to:

 Bomber Wells (Bryan Douglas Wells, 1930–2008), English cricketer
 Bryan Wells (ice hockey) (born 1966), former Canadian ice hockey player and coach

See also
Brian Wells (disambiguation)